Kauiza Venancio (born June 11, 1987 in Curitiba) is a Brazilian sprinter. She competed at the 2016 Summer Olympics in the women's 200 metres race and the women's 4 × 100 metres relay. In the 200 metres race, her time of 23.06 seconds in the heats did not qualify her for the semifinals, and the Brazilian team was disqualified from the relay.

References

1987 births
Living people
Brazilian female sprinters
Olympic athletes of Brazil
Athletes (track and field) at the 2016 Summer Olympics
Olympic female sprinters
Sportspeople from Curitiba
21st-century Brazilian women